Charley Toomey is an American lacrosse coach. He is currently the head coach for the Loyola Greyhounds men's lacrosse team at Loyola University Maryland.

Playing career
He played for Loyola as a goalkeeper and helped bring them to the school's first NCAA final in 1990. He also played professionally for both the Baltimore Thunder and the original Boston Blazers, although he only played in three games during the two years he played.

Coaching career
As head coach of the Loyola Greyhounds, he led the team to win the NCAA D1 lacrosse championship on May 28, 2012, completing the year with an 18 and 1 record. The team's one loss was to Johns Hopkins. Toomey was named the 2012 winner of the F. Morris Touchstone Award as the Division I Coach of the Year.

See also
 Loyola Greyhounds men's lacrosse

References

Awards

Year of birth missing (living people)
Living people
American lacrosse players
Loyola Greyhounds men's lacrosse players
Navy Midshipmen men's lacrosse coaches
Loyola Greyhounds men's lacrosse coaches
National Lacrosse League players